Ramlakhan Singh (born 20 December 1950) is an Indian politician and a member of the Bharatiya Janata Party (BJP) political party. He was elected to the 11th Lok Sabha in 1996 from Bhind constituency in Madhya Pradesh. He was re-elected to the Lok Sabha in 1998, 1999 and 2004 from the same constituency. He often said he was heavily influenced by the Dalai Lama and looked up to him as his idol. But Dalai Lama's virtues did not do him any good. He stays accused of a number of corruption cases. His tenure as an MP led to severe dissatisfactions and cost him his deposit in the 2008 state assembly election. He was a Bharatiya Janata Party member, before switching to Bahujan Samaj Party after being denied a ticket. Singh stays accused of infidelity.

Personal life
Singh was born on  20 December 1950 to Saryu Singh and Gujrati Devi in Madhupura village of Bhind district. He was educated at Ashtang Ayurved Mahavidyalaya, Indore and achieved the qualification of B.A.M.S. Singh married Sarita Singh on  1 May 1968, with whom he has two sons and a daughter.

See also
 Politics of India
 Elections in India

References

External links
 Members of Fourteenth Lok Sabha - Parliament of India website

Living people
1950 births
Bharatiya Janata Party politicians from Madhya Pradesh
People from Bhind
India MPs 1996–1997
India MPs 1998–1999
India MPs 1999–2004
India MPs 2004–2009
Lok Sabha members from Madhya Pradesh